Chloé Tallot (born 1973) is a French contemporary artist whose medium is video, photography, drawings and installations.

Tallot studied art at the École nationale supérieure des arts décoratifs, Paris from 1996 to 1999. She also studied philosophy at Lycée Pasteur & Sorbonne, Paris. She was born in Neuilly-sur-Seine, France and lives and works in Paris.

Education 

She was born in Neuilly-sur-Seine, France in 1973.
She spent 1975–1991 in Rabat, Morocco.

She studied philosophy and literature, Sorbonne, Paris 1993–1995, receiving his Lettres Supérieures, Lycée Pasteur, Neuilly-sur-Seine.
She then studied at Ecole Nationale Supérieure des Arts Décoratifs, Paris during 1995–1999.

Works

Solo Show 

2008
Animale & Sentimentale, French cultural centre, Constantine, Algeria

2006
Sentimentale = Animale, Le Cube, Issy-les-Moulineaux, France
Ragazze, To b art gallery, Saint Barthélemy, Caribbean

2004
Animale & Sentimentale, To b art gallery, Saint Barthélemy, Caribbean

2003
Sentimentale, Simone gallery, Paris

2001
25 Peintures, Atelier La Main d'Or, Paris

Group Show
2010
Trois jeunes artistes, Galerie Valentine de Badereau, Saint Barthélemy, Caribbean

2009
Faces, Galerie :fr:Magda Danysz, Shanghai, China
Galerie Bailly contemporain, Art Photo Expo, Miami

2008
Galerie Bailly contemporain, Show Off 2008 Show Off, Paris
Make extraordinary what is ordinary, Fantoni Studio, Milan
Under my Skin, curator Carine Le Mallet, Galerie Magda Danysz, Paris

2007
Regard sur l'Enfance, Galerie Bailly contemporain, Paris
Premiers Choix, Galerie Bailly contemporain, Paris
Video Show, curator Carine Le Mallet, Galerie Magda Danysz, Paris
Rendez-vous à Saint Barthélémy, Galerie To b art, Saint Barthélemy, Caribbean

2006
Le Minotaure, galerie du Port Autonome, Paris

2003
Animale, curator Valentine De Badereau, Espace Beaurepaire, Paris

Festival and performance

2010
Mapping Festival 2010, Mapping Festival, MAD, Geneva

2009
Arte Video Night, curator Dominique Goutard, Alain Fleischer, Jean-Luc Monterosso, Arte, Centre Pompidou, Paris
Mapping Festival, Spoutnik, Zoo, CAC, Geneva
La Bellevilloise, Festival Vision'R, Paris
Laptops R us, Video Ring, Paris

2008
La Blanchisserie, Boulogne, France
Paris est une fête, curator Magda Danysz, Palais Galliera, Paris
11, Stedelijk Museum, Amsterdam

2007
Darwin Made Me, Vidéobank, Clermont-Ferrand
Share, Reboot'bar, New York

2006
11, Stedelijk Museum, Amsterdam
Liquid Architecture, Paris-Paris, Paris

2000
Silence dans le fortin, Canal+, Algeria

1999
Pas de Temps, Flèche d'or, Paris
Partie de Pêche, Sevilla festival, Seville

Residences
2010
French cultural centre, Bandung, Indonesia

2009
Magda Danysz, Shanghai, China

2008
French cultural centre, Constantine, Algeria

2005
To b art Gallery, Saint Barthélemy, Caribbean

Publications
2009
"Chloé Tallot, Arts" WAD, No.40, March, p. 243
"The advent of dualism" Philosophy magazine, No.31, July, p. 45
"A paradoxical freedom" Philosophy magazine, No.24, March, p. 36–37

2007
Pure, Saint Barthélemy, Glowing Table, To b art, No.4 issue
L'Officiel, Regard sur l'Enfance, November–January.
Cimaise, Quai Voltaire, September–November
Gallery Guide Europe, Mur Animal, September, p. 26
Exporama, Regard sur l'Enfance, October, No.6
"Onirisme" Etapes, by Laetitia Sellam, April, No.143, p. 25–26
"French Connexion after Armory Show" Blast, Spring, No.24, p. 141–142

2006
"Organs and feelings" Le Monde 2, Michel Philippot, 9 December, p. 13
Enville, The Animal part, Caroline Bourrus, No.19, p. 44–49
De l'air, Was ist Freud ? August, No.26, p. 30

2005
Icon, Chloé Tallot, by Marie Lefort, May, p. 274–279

2004
Tropical, Saint Barthélemy, Chloé Tallot, by Suzanne Aubin, 2004–2005, p. 128–136

2003
Libération, Freud traduit en justesse, 31 January
Le Minotaure, Si on pouvait changer de vie, p. 56–57
Le Minotaure, The Gallery, p. 12–13, Les Beaux Arts sous Apple, No.2, p. 146–147
Le Minotaure, L'idiotie, Philosophy, October 2003, No.1, p. 70–75
Black & White, Sex, Black+White Books
Calmann-Lévy, book, Thinking racism, cover

2002
Les plus beaux carnets de voyages] Le Monde 2, July, No.20, p. 81
Dreaming with opened eyes Libération, 6 June
Lâcher l'idée fixe de la différence des sexes Libération, 22 December, p. 47

2001
Elle, Carnets de voyages, November, p. 72
Young Talent Photo, by Natalie Rodriguez

Commissioned
2009
Roland Garros (French Open), prestige book, Carte de Blanche, 16 pages, Paris
Neurosciences Le Monde 2, March, p. 18–21

2008
Neurons Le Monde 2, August, p. 10–15
Amy Bloom Transfuge, October, No.23, p. 31

2007
Ultra rich Le Monde 2, cover and p. 27–30, December, No.200

2003
Harper's Bazaar Russia, Xenia Gorbatcheva, Hôtel Crillon, December

2002
Temptation Guide Libération, 6 December, p. 31/32

2001
Carte Blanche, Metropole Sofitel, Hanoi, Vietnam

Works

2010
Nuances, video diptych, portrait of Jérôme Clément, Jérôme Clément, président of the European TV operator Arte, 2 projections.

2009
Aveugles, photographic mix, color.
Sentimentale Trinity, photo reel, sound, presented as a triptych, 3 projections, cycle.

2008
Her Dance, video, composed of four girls portrait, black and white, 20 min or 14 min.

2007
Fragile, Sunbeam, installation, mobile composed of 11 branches, photographs, mirrors, resin, son.
Wounded Flowers, video, color, co-realized with Arnout Hulskamp, 8 min.
Mur animal, composition of 41 photographs, 7 panels, komacel, glass, wood, 325 × 215 cm.
Organic, photo reel, sound, of the Animale series, color, 2 min.

2006
Glowing Table, glass print, steel, design Matteo Fantoni.
What-you-give-is-what-you-get, PDA video, color, Le Cube and Orange, 1 min.

2004–2010
Femmes d'Intérieur, photographs, photo reel, sound, color.

2004–2009
Ragazze, installation, video, sound, sensors and photographs, cycle continue, 9 min.

2003
Sentimentale, photographs and mix.

2003–2010
Ceci est du verre, Ceci est une table, photographs printed on glass.

2002–2005
Animale, photographs, dealing with violence in life and influenced by Darwin's scientific research.

2002
Autisme, photographic work on mental diseases and physical handicaps.

2001
Trafiquante, photographic mix.
25 paintings, oil on canvas.

2000
Silence dans le fortin, director of photography, video, 52 min, color, Algeria, by Éléonore Weber.
3'10 avant, Super 16, color, La Field Cie / Canal +

1999–2010
Carnets, work on everyday life, drawings, photographs, collages.

1999
Voyages à l'Est, photographs, barite paper print, black and white.
Pas de Temps, Super 8, color, 5mn.

1998
Rêve & Réalité, Super 8, color, 20 min.
A la recherche de…, drawings, texts and photographs about writer Philippe Sollers.

1997
Partie de Pêche, video, color, 4 min.
Coup-les, with Sophie Fougère, Super 8, color, 3 min.
Parking, video, black and white, 4 min.
Le journal de 13h, co-realized with Pierrot Dunan, video, color, 3 min.
Petite histoire, written by Sandra Matamoros, video, color, 2 min.
Bonnie & Clyde, animation video, color, 1 min.
La vie en Rose, sound track, 7 min, co-realized with Anri Sala.

Awards
1999
Partie de Pêche, Canal+ award, Videoformes, Clermont-Ferrand, France
Pas de Temps, Nanterre's short film award

1997
Correspondences Indiennes, First Leica award.

References

External links 
Chloé Tallot website
 https://web.archive.org/web/20110929125112/http://www.arte.tv/fr/Videos-sur-ARTE-TV/2151166,CmC=2902500.html
 http://cms.mappingfestival.com/2009/2009/04/15/chloe-tallot-f/
 https://web.archive.org/web/20110713202153/http://www.lesiteducube.com/espace-pro/animale-et-sentimentale-chloe-tallot_51
 http://www.photographie.com/?evtid=110790
 https://web.archive.org/web/20110725015621/http://artnews.org/artist.php?i=1260
 http://www.artnet.fr/magazine/expositions/THOMAS/Show%20off_detail.asp?picnum=4
 http://www.emploialgerie.com/actualite/138150-ccf.-lart-visuel-de-chloe-tallot.html
 http://www.sortiraparis.com/art-culture/show-off-2008-11999.html
 https://web.archive.org/web/20101124040213/http://fr.wikibooks.org/wiki/Art_vid%C3%A9o/Arte_Vid%C3%A9o_Night
 http://www.paris-art.com/marche-art/Under%20My%20Skin/Under%20My%20Skin/5651.html

1973 births
University of Paris alumni
Living people
Lycée Pasteur (Neuilly-sur-Seine) alumni